A variety of fish species are referred to as the yellow catfish, including:

North America
 Ameiurus natalis, also called the "yellow bullhead"
 Pylodictis olivaris, also called the "flathead catfish"

Asia
 Hemibagrus nemurus
 Mystus ketelis
 Horabagrus brachysoma
 Pelteobagrus fulvidraco

Europe
 Pelteobagrus fulvidraco

South America
 Pseudauchenipterus nodosus

Fish common names